= War in Yugoslavia =

War in Yugoslavia may refer to:

- World War II in Yugoslavia, mainly a guerrilla liberation war and partially a civil war taking place during World War II (1941–1945) in Axis-occupied Yugoslavia
- Yugoslav Wars, ethnic conflicts fought from 1991 to 1999 during and after the breakup of Yugoslavia
